Jehovah's Witnesses originated as a branch of the Bible Student movement, which developed in the United States in the 1870s among followers of Christian restorationist minister Charles Taze Russell. Bible Student missionaries were sent to England in 1881 and the first overseas branch was opened in London in 1900. The group took on the name International Bible Students Association and by 1914 it was also active in Canada, Germany, Australia and other countries.

The movement split into several rival organizations after Russell's death in 1916, with one—led by Joseph "Judge" Rutherford—retaining control of The Watch Tower and the Watch Tower Bible and Tract Society of Pennsylvania. Under Rutherford's direction, the International Bible Students Association introduced significant doctrinal changes that resulted in many long-term members leaving the organization. The group regrew rapidly, particularly in the mid-1930s with the introduction of new preaching methods. In 1931, the name Jehovah's witnesses was adopted, further cutting ties with Russell's earlier followers.

Substantial organizational changes continued as congregations and teaching programs worldwide came under centralized control. Further changes of its doctrines led to the prohibition of blood transfusions by members, abandonment of the cross in worship, rejection of Christmas and birthday celebrations and the view of the biblical Armageddon as a global war by God that will destroy the wicked and restore peace on earth. In 1945, the Watch Tower Society, which Russell had founded as a publishing house, amended its charter to state that its purposes included preaching about God's Kingdom, acting as a servant and governing agency of Jehovah's Witnesses and sending out missionaries and teachers for the public worship of God and Jesus.

The denomination was banned in Canada in World War I, and in Germany, the Soviet Union, Canada and Australia during World War II. Members suffered widespread persecution and mob violence in some of those countries and in the United States. The group initiated dozens of high-profile legal actions in the United States and Canada between 1938 and 1955 to establish the right of members to sell literature from door to door, abstain from flag salute ceremonies and gain legal recognition as wartime conscientious objectors. Members of the denomination suffered persecution in some African countries in the 1960s and 1970s. Since 2004 the group has suffered a series of official bans in Russia.

1869–1916

Adventist influences

About 1869 17-year-old Russell attended a meeting in Pittsburgh, Pennsylvania of a group he called "Second Adventists" and heard Advent Christian preacher Jonas Wendell expound his views on Bible prophecy. Wendell, influenced by the teachings of William Miller, rejected traditional Christian beliefs of the "immortal soul" and a literal hell and interpreted scriptures in the books of Daniel and Revelation to predict that Christ would return in 1873. Russell became convinced that God would reveal his purpose in the last days of the "Gospel age" and formed an independent Bible study group in Pittsburgh. He rejected Adventist teachings that the purpose of Christ's return was to destroy the earth and instead formed the view that Christ had died to pay a "ransom price" to atone for sinful humans, intending to restore humans to Edenic perfection with the prospect of living forever. 

Like Wendell, he rejected the concept of "hellfire" and the immortal soul. In the mid-1870s, he published 50,000 copies of a pamphlet, The Object and Manner of Our Lord's Return explaining his views and his belief that Christ would return invisibly before the battle of Armageddon. He later acknowledged the influence of Adventist ministers George Storrs (who had earlier predicted Christ's return in 1844) and George Stetson in the formation of his doctrines; author James Penton claims he also strongly reflected the teachings of Philadelphia Lutheran pastor Joseph Seiss.

In January 1876, Russell read an issue of Herald of the Morning, a periodical edited by Adventist preacher Nelson H. Barbour of Rochester, New York, but which had almost ceased publication because of dwindling subscriptions. Barbour, like other Adventists, had earlier applied the biblical time prophecies of Miller and Wendell to calculate that Christ would return in 1874 to bring a "bonfire"; when this failed to eventuate he and co-writer J.H. Paton had concluded that though their calculations of the timing of Christ's return were correct, they had erred about its manner. They subsequently decided that Christ's return, or parousia, was invisible, and that Christ had therefore been present since 1874. Russell "rejoiced" to find that others had reached the same conclusion on the parousia and decided their application of Adventist time prophecies — which he said he had "so long despised" — merited further examination. He met Barbour, accepted his detailed and complex arguments on prophetic chronology and provided him with funds to write a book that combined their views.

The book, Three Worlds and the Harvest of This World, was published in early 1877. It articulated ideas that remained the teachings of Russell's associates for the next 40 years, many of which are still embraced by Jehovah's Witnesses: it identified a 2,520-year-long era called "the Gentile Times", which would end in 1914, and broke from Adventist teachings by advancing Russell's concept of "restitution" — that all humankind since Adam would be resurrected to the earth and given the opportunity for eternal perfect human life. Russell claimed it was the first book to combine biblical end-time prophecies with the concept of restitution. It discussed the concept of parallel dispensations, which held that there were prophetic parallels between the Jewish and Gospel ages, and suggested the "new creation" would begin 6000 years after Adam's creation, a point in time he believed had been reached in 1872. 

It also revealed the authors' belief that Christ had left heaven in 1874 to return to earth and their expectation that God's "harvest" of the "saints" would end in early 1878, when they would all be taken to heaven. Russell, Barbour and Paton began traveling to hold public meetings to discuss their beliefs. For Russell, it was not enough: "Noticing how quickly people seemed to forget what they had heard, it soon became evident that while the meetings were useful in awakening interest, a monthly journal was needed to hold that interest and develop it." He provided Barbour with additional funds to resurrect The Herald of the Morning. Russell severed his relationship with the magazine in July, 1879 after Barbour publicly disputed the concept of the ransom. He began publishing his own monthly magazine, Zion's Watch Tower and Herald of Christ's Presence (now known as The Watchtower), which he sent to all the subscribers of the Herald, disputing Barbour's teaching.

Watch Tower Society
In 1881, Zion's Watch Tower Tract Society was formed as an unincorporated administrative agency for the purpose of disseminating tracts, papers, doctrinal treatises and Bibles, with "Pastor" Russell, as he was by then called, as secretary and William Henry Conley as president. Three years later, on December 15, 1884, Russell became the president of the society when it was legally incorporated in Pennsylvania. He said the corporation was "not a 'religious society' in the ordinary meaning of this term," explaining: "This is a business association merely ... a business convenience in disseminating the truth." 

Russell began to write a stream of articles, books, pamphlets and sermons, which by his death totaled 50,000 printed pages, with almost 20 million copies of his books printed and distributed around the world. In 1886, he wrote The Divine Plan of the Ages, a 424-page book that was the first of what became a six-volume series called "Millennial Dawn," later renamed "Studies in the Scriptures," which established his fundamental doctrines. As a consequence, the Bible Students were sometimes called "Millennial Dawnists".

Congregations
 
The first study groups or congregations were established in 1879. Within a year more than 30 of them were meeting for six-hour study sessions under Russell's direction, to examine the Bible and his writings. The groups were autonomous ecclesia, an organizational structure Russell regarded as a return to "primitive simplicity". In an 1882 Watch Tower article he said his nationwide community of study groups was "strictly unsectarian and consequently recognize no sectarian name ... we have no creed (fence) to bind us together or to keep others out of our company. The Bible is our only standard, and its teachings our only creed." He added: "We are in fellowship with all Christians in whom we can recognize the Spirit of Christ." 

In 1884 he said the only appropriate names for his group would be "Church of Christ", "Church of God" or "Christians". He concluded: "By whatsoever names men may call us, it matters not to us; we acknowledge none other name than 'the only name given under heaven and among men' — Jesus Christ. We call ourselves simply Christians." In 1895, discussing the best form of meeting to study his writings, Russell warned: "Beware of organization. It is wholly unnecessary. The Bible rules will be the only rules you will need. Do not seek to bind others' consciences, and do not permit others to bind yours."

Elders and deacons were elected by congregations and Russell tolerated a great latitude of belief among members. He discouraged formal disciplinary procedures by congregation elders, claiming this was beyond their authority, instead recommending that an individual who continued in a wrong course be judged by the entire ecclesia, or congregation, which could ultimately "withdraw from him its fellowship". Disfellowshipping did not mean the wrongdoer was shunned in all social circumstances or by all Bible Students.

In 1894, Russell introduced the role of "pilgrim" workers, men chosen for their maturity, meekness and Bible knowledge, who would visit congregations for up to three days when requested, giving talks. The pilgrims, who initially served part-time but later became full-time workers, also delivered talks at conventions.

From 1895, he recommended that congregations study his Studies in the Scriptures paragraph-by-paragraph to learn the "truth" he had discovered, and in 1905 he recommended replacing verse-by-verse Bible studies with what he called "Berean Studies" of topics he chose.

Preaching

Russell advertised for 1,000 preachers in 1881, and encouraged all who were members of "the body of Christ" to go forth as "colporteurs" or evangelizers and preach to their neighbors in order to gather the remainder of the "little flock" of saints before they were called to heaven. Colporteurs, renamed "pioneers" in the 1930s, left householders with a copy of Russell's 130-page booklet Food For Thinking Christians and a sample copy of Zion's Watch Tower and returned days later to retrieve the book or accept a payment for it. The workers received a commission on the sale, but Russell warned them to concentrate less on the money than on the task of spreading the truth.

When a Pittsburgh newspaper's publication of the full text of Russell's 1903 debates with Methodist minister Dr E. L. Eaton resulted in a huge demand for copies, several newspapers began printing weekly sermons by Russell. By 1907 21 million copies of his sermons were being printed a year in 11 U.S. newspapers. Russell entered a contract with a newspaper syndicate to give his sermons wider coverage. By December 1909 they were appearing in 400 papers, to a weekly readership of 2.5 million.

By 1910 his sermons were supplied to more than 1,000 newspapers, some of which billed him as "the people's favorite preacher". A peak of 2,024 papers in the U.S., Canada, Britain, South Africa and Australia was reached in 1913. The publicity, including press coverage of annual overseas tours between 1908 and 1913, gave Russell a measure of international celebrity, prompting letters of concern by Bible Students over his supposed ostentatiousness, which led Russell to defend his mode of transport and accommodation.

In 1914, Russell released an eight-hour-long film, The Photo-Drama of Creation, that attempted to portray chronologically the history of the world from creation to the millennial reign of Christ. The film, accompanied by a gramophone soundtrack, was screened for free in two four-hour sittings around the world, attracting more than 1.2 million patrons in Britain in 1914 alone. The cost of the production and screenings was so high it created financial difficulties for the society, but by Russell's death it was reported that the film had been seen by more than nine million people.

Organizational expansion
Two missionaries were sent to England in 1881. Overseas branches were opened in London (1900), Germany (1903) and Australia and Switzerland (1904). The Watch Tower Society's headquarters were transferred to Brooklyn, New York in 1908.
In 1910, Russell introduced the name International Bible Students Association as a means of identifying his worldwide community of Bible study groups. The name was used when advertising and conducting conventions of Russell's followers.

The first foreign-language edition of Zion's Watch Tower was published in 1883 when Russell produced a sample copy in Swedish and in 1885 the magazine was also translated into German for German-speaking Pennsylvanians.

Doctrinal development

By 1904, Russell's doctrinal development was almost complete. His sixth and final part of "Studies in the Scriptures", The New Creation, established that Revelation 7 spoke of two heavenly classes of Christians — 144,000 who would serve as a royal priesthood with Christ and a Great Company who would be brought to perfection on a lesser plane, similar to that of angels, serving the 144,000. He believed that 1878 marked the "fall of Babylon", when God officially judged that Christendom had proven unfaithful. He believed the "time of the end" in Daniel 12 ran from 1799 to 1914, that Christ had returned to earth in 1874, began his reign in 1878 and that from that date the anointed had been resurrected to heaven at their death. He initially taught that Armageddon had begun in 1874, which would culminate in worldwide anarchy and the overthrow of all political rulership in 1914 at the conclusion of the "times of the Gentiles". By 1897 he began to teach that Armageddon would instead begin in 1914. 

The earthly part of God's kingdom would be administered from Jerusalem in a re-established nation of Israel and under the control of the resurrected ancient Jewish prophets. All of mankind would over time be resurrected to earth in reverse order of death, Adam and Eve being the last, and be given the instruction and guidance necessary to prove themselves obedient to God in order to attain eternal life. Early in the resurrection, "ancient worthies" including Abraham, Isaac and Jacob would be raised to occupy positions of overseers and representatives of the invisible heavenly government ruling from Jerusalem. The Millennial Age, which he believed had begun in 1874, would run to 2874 or 2914 AD, when a test of earth's inhabitants would decide their ultimate destinies, to life or everlasting death.

In 1905, Paul S. L. Johnson, one of the traveling "Pilgrim" speakers and a former Lutheran minister, pointed out to Russell that his doctrines on the New Covenant had undergone a complete reversal: until 1880 he had taught that the New Covenant would be inaugurated only after the last of the 144,000 anointed Christians had been taken to heaven, but since 1881 he had written that it was already in force. Russell reconsidered the question and in January 1907 wrote several Watch Tower articles reaffirming his 1880 position—that "the new covenant belongs exclusively to the coming age"—adding that the church had no mediator, but that Christ was the "advocate". He also taught that Christians making up the 144,000 would join Christ as a "joint heir" and assistant mediator during the millennium.

On October 24, 1909, former Watch Tower Society secretary-treasurer E.C. Henninges, who was by then the Australian branch manager based in Melbourne, wrote Russell an open letter of protest trying to persuade him to abandon the teaching, and calling on Bible Students to examine its legitimacy. When Russell refused, Henninges and most of the Melbourne congregation left Russell's movement to form the New Covenant Fellowship. Hundreds of the estimated 10,000 U.S. Bible Students also left, including pilgrim M. L. McPhail, a member of the Chicago Bible Students, and A. E. Williamson of Brooklyn, forming the New Covenant Believers. 

Russell died on October 31, 1916, in Pampa, Texas during a cross-country preaching trip. For the next 10 years, the Watch Tower Society continued to teach the view that he had fulfilled the roles of the "Laodicean Messenger" of Revelation 3:14–22 and the "Faithful and Wise Servant" of Matthew 24:45.

1917–1942

Organizational developments

At the corporation's annual general meeting on January 6, 1917, Joseph Franklin Rutherford, the Society's legal counsel, was elected as Russell's successor, with new by-laws passed to strengthen the president's authority. Within months, four of the Society's seven directors claimed he was acting without consulting the board and described him as "dogmatic, authoritarian and secretive". A directors' meeting in June proposed returning control of the Society to the board, but at a stormy five-hour meeting on July 17, 1917, Rutherford announced he had appointed four new directors to replace the four who had opposed him, claiming they had no legal status on the board because of conflict with Pennsylvania law.

At the same meeting Rutherford surprised the headquarters staff and most of the directors by announcing the release of the book The Finished Mystery, dealing with the prophecies of the books of Revelation and Ezekiel and based on Russell's writings. The book, written by Bible Students Clayton J. Woodworth and George H. Fisher, was described as the "posthumous work of Russell" and the seventh volume of Studies in the Scriptures. It was an immediate best-seller and was translated into six languages. Rutherford and the ousted directors published a number of newsletters through 1917 and 1918 attacking each other and some congregations split into opposing groups of those loyal either to the president or those he had expelled.

Rutherford staged a purge within the Brooklyn headquarters to force out those not wholeheartedly on his side and required those who remained to sign an oath of allegiance to him. He was re-elected as president in 1918 with a big majority, but by mid-1919 about one in seven Bible Students had left, forming such groups as The Stand Fast Bible Students Association, Laymen's Home Missionary Movement, Dawn Bible Students Association, Pastoral Bible Institute, Elijah Voice Movement and Eagle Society. Subscriptions to The Watch Tower also fell from 45,000 to fewer than 3000 between 1914 and 1918.

Rutherford introduced a vast advertising campaign to expose the "unrighteousness" of religions and their alliances with "beastly" governments, expanding on claims in The Finished Mystery that patriotism was akin to murder. The campaign provoked anger among the clergy and governments in North America and Europe, where Bible Students began to be arrested, mobbed and tarred and feathered. On February 12, 1918, The Finished Mystery was banned by the Canadian government for what a Winnipeg newspaper described as "seditious and antiwar statements".

On February 24 in Los Angeles Rutherford gave the first of his talk series "Millions Now Living May Never Die" (the title of the talk was changed five weeks later to "Millions Now Living Will Never Die") in which he attacked the clergy, describing them as "the most reprehensible men on earth for the great war that is now afflicting mankind". Three days later the Army Intelligence Bureau seized the Society's Los Angeles offices and on March 4 the US government ordered the removal of seven pages of The Finished Mystery if distribution was to continue.

In early May 1918 US Attorney General Thomas Watt Gregory condemned the book as dangerous propaganda and days later warrants were issued for the arrest of Rutherford and seven other Watch Tower directors and officers on charges of sedition under the Espionage Act amid claims they were conspiring to cause disloyalty and encouraging the refusal of military duty. On June 21 seven of them, including Rutherford, were sentenced to 20 years' imprisonment. They were released on bail in March 1919 after an appeals court ruled they had been wrongly convicted and in May 1920 the government announced all charges had been dropped.

On his release from prison, Rutherford began a major reorganization of Bible Student activities. The Watch Tower Society set up its own printing establishment and in 1919 Rutherford founded the magazine The Golden Age (now Awake!), which the Bible Students began distributing in response to an increasing emphasis by the Brooklyn headquarters on door-to-door preaching. Brooklyn appointed a "director" in each congregation in 1919, and a year later directed all congregation members who participated in the preaching work to report weekly on their witnessing activity. As the Bible Students' preaching work expanded, Rutherford moved to take greater control over their message in a bid to unify the message and become the spokesman for the organization.

Major annual conventions were organized from 1922 and 1928, which were as much publicity events as spiritual gatherings. At an eight-day assembly at Cedar Point, Ohio in 1922 he launched a series of international conventions under the theme "Advertise the King and Kingdom", attracting crowds of up to 20,000, who were urged to "herald the message far and wide". "Behold the King!" Rutherford told conventioners. "You are his publicity agents." He stressed that the prime purpose of all Bible Students was to preach publicly in fulfillment of Matthew 24:14, especially in the form of door-to-door evangelism with the Society's publications, rather than prayer, meditation or Bible study. The traditional Bible Student prayer and testimony meetings were divided into two parts with one becoming a "service meeting", devoted to promoting public preaching.

In 1924, he expanded his means of spreading the Watch Tower message with the start of 15-minute radio broadcasts, initially from WBBR, based on Staten Island, and eventually via a network of as many as 480 radio stations. A 1931 talk was broadcast throughout North America, Australia and France, but the virulence of his attacks on the clergy was strong enough to result in both the NBC and BBC radio networks banning him from the airwaves. Later still, in the late 1930s, he advocated the use of "sound cars" and portable phonographs with which talks by Rutherford were played to passersby and householders.

The new preaching methods brought an influx of members through the early 1920s, but attendance at the Bible Students' yearly Memorial fell sharply again, dropping from 90,434 in 1925 to 17,380 in 1928. Rutherford dismissed their defection as the Lord "shaking out" the unfaithful. Author Tony Wills, who analyzed attendance and "field worker" statistics, suggests it was the "more dedicated" Bible Students who quit through the 1920s, to be replaced by newcomers in larger numbers, creating what author Robert Crompton described as one of the most significant of the movement's breaks with its early history.

At a convention at Columbus, Ohio on July 26, 1931, Rutherford made a psychological break with the large number of disaffected Bible Students by proposing the adoption of the name Jehovah's witnesses, based on the scripture at Isaiah 43:10, "Ye are my witnesses, saith the Lord". The Watch Tower said the new, distinctive name was designed to exalt God's name and end public confusion caused by the proliferation of groups carrying the name "Bible Students". It explained: "It will be a name that could not be used by another, and such as none other will want to use." In 1932, he eliminated the system of congregations electing bodies of elders, claiming the office of elder was unscriptural; in 1938, he replaced the earlier system of congregational self-government with a "theocratic" or "God-ruled" organizational system in which the Brooklyn headquarters would make all appointments in congregations worldwide. 

Consolation magazine explained: "The Theocracy is at present administered by the Watch Tower Bible and Tract Society, of which Judge Rutherford is the president and general manager." Rutherford, who had shown an earlier interest in politics, applied terms to the organization that were more common in politics and business: "organization" replaced "congregation" when referring to the worldwide community of believers, while "companies" denoted individual congregations. He pushed for more "field service" and "campaigns" of kingdom "advertising" in "territories", with "publishers" working under the direction of a field service "captain".

Under Rutherford, Jehovah's Witnesses grew from about 44,000 in 1928 to about 115,000 at the time of his death on January 8, 1942.

Doctrinal changes

Rutherford's term as president was marked by a succession of changes to doctrines, with many of Russell's teachings altered or abandoned and many new teachings introduced. The Finished Mystery declared that God would destroy churches "wholesale" and church members by the millions in 1918, and that all earthly governments would be destroyed in 1920, resulting in anarchy. Expectations remained strong that the change of the "saints" and completion of the "body of Christ" in heaven was imminent. A Watch Tower report on the 1918 Brooklyn convention said there was good reason to believe the gathering "might be the last in this vicinity, before the great convention beyond the veil".

Disregarding Russell's rejection of 1925 as a year of importance, Rutherford announced in 1920 that Christ's thousand-year reign would begin in 1925, bringing the restoration of an earthly paradise and the resurrection to earth of the ancient Jewish prophets referred to as "the ancient worthies" such as Abraham and Isaac. Jerusalem would become the world capital, and the "princes" would communicate with all humankind by radio. 

The pronouncements prompted many Bible Students to give up their businesses and jobs and sell their homes. Bible Student farmers in Canada and the US refused to seed their spring crops in 1925 and mocked members of their movement who did. Rutherford had a luxury villa, Beth Sarim, built in San Diego, California, in 1930 to house the biblical "princes" who were expected to be resurrected before Armageddon. Watch Tower publications made no admission of error over the predictions for 1925, but Rutherford gave apologies at IBSA conventions.

Armageddon was redefined in 1925 as a battle between God and Satan, resulting in the overthrow of human governments and false religion. A 1926 Watchtower article introduced a new emphasis on the importance of the name "Jehovah". From 1926 publications began discrediting earlier teachings on the importance of Christian "character development" or personal "sanctification". In 1927 they discarded the teaching that Russell had been the "faithful and wise servant" of Matthew 24:45–47. By then the Watch Tower Society had rejected the belief that Russell alone had been the sole channel of scriptural enlightenment. 

In 1927 the Society disposed of remaining copies of Russell's Studies in the Scriptures and The Finished Mystery and ceased printing the books. In 1928 Russell's teaching that the natural Jews would be restored to Palestine and hold a prominent place in the earthly part of God's kingdom was dropped. Christmas celebrations ceased in 1928 after a radio broadcast and Golden Age articles on their pagan origins.

In 1929, Rutherford announced that the vindication of God's name—which would ultimately occur when millions of unbelievers were destroyed at Armageddon—was the primary doctrine of Christianity and more important than God's display of goodness or grace towards humans. By 1933, the timing of Christ's parousia and the start of the "last days" had been moved from 1874 to 1914 with the principles of parallel dispensations retained to place Christ's enthronement 3½ years later in 1918. In 1935 a new interpretation of the "great company" of Revelation 7 placed them on earth as survivors of Armageddon rather than in heaven and from that point converts to the movement were generally identified as those who, if worthy, would qualify for life on a paradise earth. 

In 1935, Witnesses were told they should refuse to salute the flag, stand for the national anthem, or accept alternative service provided for those who had conscientious objection to military service. Reference to the cross and crucifixion in Watch Tower publications ceased in 1936 when it was asserted that Christ had actually died on a tree. By 1939 Watch Tower publications explained that only those who were part of God's "organization" would be spared at Armageddon.

Persecution and opposition

From 1927 onwards, Bible Students were urged to extend their door-to-door preaching to include Sundays. The move quickly attracted opposition from the clergy. In 1928 Bible Students began to be arrested in the U.S. for breaching local by-laws on Sabbath observance. Rutherford challenged the laws in courts, ultimately fighting hundreds of cases in New Jersey alone as he insisted the preachers were not selling literature, but distributing it for a contribution to Society funds.

In 1935, Witnesses were told they should refuse to salute national flags, stand for national anthems, or accept alternative service provided for those who had conscientious objection to military service. In late 1936 U.S. schools began expelling Witness children who refused to salute the flag. When the U.S. Supreme Court affirmed the right of schools to expel non-conforming children in June 1940, many states began passing laws requiring compulsory flag salute and similarly expelling children. The Supreme Court decision prompted a wave of violence against U.S. Witnesses, mostly in small towns and rural areas, where they were beaten, castrated, tarred and feathered and in some cases killed.

More than 2,500 cases were reported from 1940 to 1944. Hundreds of Witnesses were arrested and charged with crimes including sedition.

In Germany, preaching activity was banned and the Watch Tower Society headquarters was seized and closed. Thousands of Witnesses were arrested on peddling charges from 1922. In 1933, following the rise to power of Adolf Hitler, government restrictions were tightened, prompting the public distribution of more than two million copies of a Declaration of Facts in which the Witnesses protested at their treatment and requested the right to preach. It had little effect: Witnesses were fired from their jobs and about 2,000 were imprisoned in concentration camps. Jehovah's Witnesses were the first Christian denomination to be banned and the most extensively persecuted Christian group during the Nazi era.

Witnesses in Japan were imprisoned and tortured. Members in the U.S., Canada, Australia and Britain were imprisoned as conscientious objectors. The Witnesses were banned in Germany in 1936, Canada in July 1940 and Australia in January 1941. Under Rutherford's leadership, a legal staff was developed to establish their right to preach and their right to refrain from nationalistic ceremonies. Between 1938 and 1955 the Watch Tower Society won 36 out of 45 religion-related court cases. These legal battles resulted in significant expansions in freedom of speech and religion in both countries.

Writers including American essayist Barbara Grizzuti Harrison, William Whalen, Alan Rogerson and William Schnell have claimed the group was complicit in its own victimisation in the United States, often goading authorities with cartoons and books that ridiculed and denigrated church and state and provocative mass assemblies in which the Witnesses flooded towns with preachers. They claim a deliberate course of martyrdom served to attract society's dispossessed and oppressed members and also provided apparent validation of the "truth" of the Watchtower cause as evidenced by the level of opposition from the outside world as they struggled to serve God.

1942–1975

Rutherford was succeeded by Nathan Homer Knorr. Knorr's tenure as president was notable for the transfer from individual to corporate leadership. None of the Society's publications after 1942 acknowledged authorship, and were instead attributed to an anonymous Writing Committee. From about 1944, the term "governing body" began to be used with a measure of frequency, with the term initially applied to the Watch Tower Society's seven-man Board of Directors. 

Knorr began a campaign of real estate acquisition in Brooklyn to expand the organisation's world headquarters, expanded printing production throughout the world, and organized a series of international assemblies that dwarfed those of Rutherford in the 1920s. In 1958, more than 253,000 Witnesses gathered at two New York City venues, Yankee Stadium and the Polo Grounds, for an eight-day convention where more than 7,000 were baptized. Other large conventions were held in the US, Canada and Germany.

He instituted major training programs, including the Watchtower Bible School of Gilead to train missionaries, and the Theocratic Ministry School to give instruction in preaching and public speaking at the congregational level. He commissioned a new translation of the Bible, which was released progressively from 1950. It was published as the complete New World Translation of the Holy Scriptures in 1961. Also produced were a Greek-English New Testament interlinear, The Kingdom Interlinear Translation of the Greek Scriptures, and a Bible encyclopedia, Aid to Bible Understanding. The offices of elder and ministerial servant (deacon) were restored to Witness congregations in 1972, with appointments being made from headquarters.

Knorr's vice-president, Frederick William Franz, became the leading theologian for the group and the pace of doctrinal change slowed. Blood transfusions were prohibited for Witnesses from 1945. In 1961 the eating of blood in meat was prohibited. The Watchtower instructed Witnesses to check with their butcher whether the animals and fowl he sold had been properly drained of their blood. Birthday celebrations were described as "objectionable" in 1951 because of their pagan origins, and other explicit rules regarding acceptable conduct among members were introduced, with a greater emphasis placed on disfellowshipping as a disciplinary measure.

Adult male Witnesses in the US, Britain, and some European countries were jailed for refusal of military service in the post-war years, with particularly harsh treatment meted out in Portugal, Spain, Italy, Greece, East Germany and Romania. Wide-scale persecution of Witnesses in several African nations was launched between 1967 and 1975, with as many as 21,000 fleeing Malawi to refugee camps in Zambia after a series of murders and beatings in 1972. 7,000 Mozambiquean members of the denomination were arrested in 1975 to be sent to communist re-education camps.

During Knorr's presidency, membership of Jehovah's Witnesses grew from 108,000 to more than two million.

Predictions for 1975
From 1966, Witness publications heightened anticipation of Christ's thousand-year millennial reign beginning in late 1975. Repeating the 1925 cycle of excitement, anticipation and then disappointment, Witness publications and convention talks intensified focus on 1975 as the "appropriate" time for God to act, with statements that "the immediate future is certain to be filled with climactic events ... within a few years at most the final parts of the Bible prophecy relative to these 'last days' will undergo fulfillment". The September 15, 1971 issue of The Watchtower warned that "all worldly careers are soon to come to an end", and advised youths that they should not "get interested in ‘higher education’ for a future that will never eventuate."

A chart in a 1971 Awake! indicated the "thrilling hope" of a "grand Sabbath of rest and relief" in the mid-1970s at the close of 6000 years of human history. Some Witnesses sold businesses and homes, gave up jobs, deferred medical procedures and set aside plans to start a family in anticipation of Armageddon's arrival. The May 1974 issue of the Watch Tower Society's newsletter, Our Kingdom Ministry, commended Witnesses who had sold homes and property to devote themselves to preaching in the "short time" remaining.

Watch Tower literature did not state dogmatically that 1975 would definitely mark the end, and the buildup was tempered with cautions that there was no certainty that Armageddon would arrive in 1975, but magazines warned that "time is running out rapidly" and that "only a few years, at most" remained before Armageddon. Circuit assemblies in 1970 held a public talk entitled "Who will conquer the world in the 1970s?". In a speech in Australia in 1975, the society's vice-president Frederick Franz went so far as to name a precise date—September 5, 1975—as the "end of the present wicked system". 

Witnesses were urged that they should not be "toying with the words of Jesus that 'concerning that day and hour nobody knows' ... to the contrary, one should be keenly aware that the end of this system of things is rapidly coming to its violent end." The number of baptisms soared from about 59,000 in 1966, to more than 297,000 in 1974. Membership declined after expectations for 1975 failed. In 1976 The Watchtower advised those who had been "disappointed" by the failure of the predictions for 1975 to adjust their viewpoint because their understanding had been "based on wrong premises". In 1980, after several proposals by Governing Body members to apologize to Witnesses were voted down, the Watch Tower Society admitted its responsibility in building up hope regarding 1975.

1976–present

Organizational developments
The leadership structure of Jehovah's Witnesses was reorganized from January 1, 1976, with the power of the presidency passed to the Governing Body of Jehovah's Witnesses and the establishment of six committees to oversee tasks such as writing, teaching, publishing and evangelizing work. At this time, Watch Tower Society publications began using the capitalized name, Jehovah's Witnesses. Following Knorr's death in 1977, Frederick William Franz became president of the Watch Tower Society of Pennsylvania.

A purge of senior Brooklyn headquarters staff was carried out in April and May 1980 after it was discovered some at the highest ranks of the hierarchy dissented with core Watch Tower Society doctrines, particularly surrounding the significance of 1914, and wished to propose adjustments as "new understandings" to continue the century-long tradition of changes in doctrines. Unease at the chronology doctrines had surfaced within the Governing Body earlier in 1980. In February, three Governing Body members – aware that those who had been alive in 1914 were rapidly dwindling in number, despite the teaching that their generation would be alive to see Armageddon—had proposed a radical change in Watch Tower doctrines to require that the "generation" that would see the arrival of Armageddon had been alive only since 1957, the year of the launch of the Soviet space satellite Sputnik. The proposal, which would have extended the deadline for Armageddon by 43 years, failed to gain a majority vote. 

Internal dissatisfaction with official doctrines continued to grow, leading to a series of secret investigations and judicial hearings. Among those expelled from the Witnesses was former Governing Body member Raymond Franz. Many of those expelled were labelled by Governing Body members as "spiritual fornicators", "mentally diseased" and "insane". The purge resulted in a number of schisms in the movement in Canada, Britain, and northern Europe, and prompted the formation of loose groups of disaffected former Witnesses. The Watch Tower Society responded to the crisis with a new, hardened attitude towards the treatment of defectors and expelled Witnesses.

In 1992, Milton George Henschel, then a member of the Governing Body, succeeded Franz as president of the Watch Tower Society of Pennsylvania. In 2000, members of the Governing Body resigned from positions on the boards of the Watch Tower Society and its subsidiary corporations in order to focus on doctrinal matters. Don Alden Adams then replaced Henschel as president. Following Adams' death in 2014, Robert Ciranko became president of the Watch Tower Society.

Beginning in 2004, various Watch Tower Society properties in Brooklyn were sold in preparation for the establishment of a new world headquarters in Warwick, New York, completed in 2016.

Doctrinal changes
In 1995, changes regarding their understanding of Jesus' comments regarding "this generation" (from Matthew 24:34) were published. Throughout the previous four decades, Jehovah's Witnesses had taught that the generation that saw the events of 1914 would not die out before Armageddon came. The understanding of the "generation" was again adjusted in 2008, to refer to the remnant of the anointed. In 2010, the definition of the generation was changed again, wherein the lives of anointed individuals living in 1914 overlap with a second group alive in the present day, some of whom will see Armageddon. Jehovah's Witnesses continue to teach that Armageddon is imminent.

See also

 Development of Jehovah's Witnesses doctrine
 Eschatology of Jehovah's Witnesses
 Persecution of Jehovah's Witnesses
 Unfulfilled Watch Tower Society predictions
 Watch Tower Society presidency dispute (1917)

References

Further reading
Four official histories of Jehovah's Witnesses have been published by the Watch Tower Society. The first two are out of print. The most recent one is available online.

 Qualified To Be Ministers, pages 297–345 (1955)
 Jehovah's Witnesses in the Divine Purpose (1959)
 Jehovah's Witnesses—Proclaimers of God's Kingdom (1993)
 God’s Kingdom Rules! (2014)

Books by members
 Jehovah's Witnesses: The New World Society by Marley Cole. This book received a positive review in the August 15, 1955 Watchtower: "Much of the material was gathered by personal interviews with witnesses, some of them being officials of the Society. Frequently in the news is something about the religion of President Eisenhower's parents. This book gives the facts often overlooked or concealed, with documentary proof that they were Jehovah's witnesses for many years." Cole was an active Witness and wrote the book in collaboration with Witness leaders. It was also distributed by the Watch Tower Society. 229 pages. Publisher: The Vantage Press, 1955.
 Faith on the March by A. H. Macmillan. Macmillan provides a first-person account of the early history of Jehovah's Witnesses from his meeting of Charles Taze Russell in 1900 to the time of the writing of the book (1957). He served with three of the Presidents of Watch Tower Bible and Tract Society: Russell, Rutherford, and Knorr (who wrote the book's introduction). Publisher: Prentice-Hall, Inc. Library of Congress Catalog Card Number 57-8528 (Englewood Cliffs, N.J. 1957)
 A People for His Name: A History of Jehovah's Witnesses and an Evaluation by Tony Wills, (2006) 2nd edition. (The first edition was published under the pseudonym Timothy White.) The author, a lifelong Witness, presents an in-depth look at the Bible Student/Jehovah's Witness movement. He explores its doctrinal growth and shifts and notes schisms from the main body. 300 pages. .
 Armed with the Constitution: Jehovah's Witnesses in Alabama and the U.S Supreme Court, 1939-1946 by Merlin Newton. Newton researches the contributions of two Jehovah's Witnesses—a black man and a white woman—in expanding the meaning of the First Amendment in 1940s Alabama. She examines two key U.S. Supreme Court decisions, as well as court records, memoirs, letters, and interviews of Jehovah's Witnesses. Publisher: University Alabama Press; Religion and American Culture Series, Reprint edition (June 28, 2002). Paperback: 240 pages. 
 O'er the Ramparts They Watched by Victor Blackwell.

Books by non-members
 Millions Now Living Will Never Die: A Study of Jehovah's Witnesses by Alan Rogerson. Constable. 1969
 Jehovah's Witnesses in Canada: Champions of freedom of speech and worship by M. James Penton. Penton, who is a professor emeritus of history at University of Lethbridge (a former member of the Jehovah's Witnesses), examines the history of legal activities that led to expansion of religious freedoms in Canada. Referenced in the January 1, 1977 Watchtower, page 11 and the 1979 Yearbook of Jehovah's Witnesses, page 94. Publisher: Macmillan of Canada.  (Canada, 1976)
 Apocalypse Delayed: The Story of Jehovah's Witnesses by M. James Penton. Penton, who is a professor emeritus of history at University of Lethbridge, examines the history of Jehovah's Witnesses, and their doctrines. Read selections from: Google Book Search Publisher: University of Toronto Press.  (Canada, 1998)

External links
Official website of Jehovah's Witnesses
Pastor-Russell.com

 
Jehovah's Witnesses